Sten Forselius (3 December 1890 – 31 January 1937) was a Swedish sports shooter. He competed in the 25 m rapid fire pistol event at the 1924 Summer Olympics.

References

External links
 

1890 births
1937 deaths
Swedish male sport shooters
Olympic shooters of Sweden
Shooters at the 1924 Summer Olympics
Sport shooters from Stockholm